Dundalk entered the 2022 season having finished in sixth place in the league the previous season and having failed to qualify for European football for the first time since the 2012 season. They were still the League of Ireland Cup holders because, after they had won it in 2019, the competition was not held in 2020 or 2021. 2022 was Dundalk's 14th consecutive season in the top tier of Irish football, their 87th in all, and their 96th in the League of Ireland. The 100th anniversary of the club's entry to the Leinster Senior League and therefore its first match as a senior club passed on 7th October 2022.

Stephen O'Donnell was the club's new head coach going into the new term, having replaced Vinny Perth in the close season.

Season summary
The league season started on 18 February 2022. Dundalk moved into third position after the round 15 victory over Bohemians and remained in the top three—the automatic European qualification positions—for the remainder of the season. A run of one defeat in 15 games from round 12 to round 26 saw an unlikely title challenge develop but injuries to several key players and mixed results subsequently saw that challenge fade in the final series of matches. A home victory over Bohemians in round 35 guaranteed third place and qualification for the 2023–24 UEFA Europa Conference League.

A notable milestone was reached in round five away to Shelbourne, when Patrick Hoban scored to become the first player to score 100 league goals in the club's history. Another milestone was reached in round 18, when the club achieved its 1,000th league victory in the top tier of the League of Ireland with a win at home to St Patrick's Athletic. For the round 12 home fixture against Shelbourne, the team wore a specially commissioned shirt in aid of the Motor Neurone Disease charity, 'Watch Your Back'. The match-worn shirts were subsequently auctioned with all proceeds going to the charity.

The club's Honorary President, Des Casey, died in August. The club renamed Oriel Park 'Casey's Field' in his honour until the end of the season because Oriel is built on land that has been leased from the Casey Family Trust since 1936.

In the FAI Cup, they were defeated in the quarter final by First Division side Waterford.

The end of the season saw club captain Brian Gartland retire after 10 seasons having made 251 appearances for the club.

First-Team Squad (2022)
Sources:
Note: Substitute appearances in brackets

Competitions

Premier Division

League table

FAI Cup

Awards

Player of the Month

Footnotes

References

Dundalk F.C. seasons
Dundalk